Midaircondo was a Swedish electronica duo consisting of Lisa Nordström and Lisen Rylander Löve, active 2003-2015.

Since the start in 2003 Midaircondo has released three albums, toured around Europe, Africa and South and North America. The duo has created and performed music for dance performances, theater, TV, radio and movies. Midaircondo are known for their improvised concerts with a mix of acoustic instruments, voice, electronics and video. The duo has performed at a number of international festivals such as Sónar (ES), Mutek Festival (CL), Molde Jazzfestival (NO) and Berlin Music Week (DE).

Discography 

Midaircondo Feat. Michala Østergaard-Nielsen - Reports On The Horizon
CD, Twin Seed Recordings/Playground Scandinavia, 2011
 In The Neon Fruit Supermarket
 The Zebra Crossing - Walking
 The Zebra Crossing - Awaiting You
 At The Rooftop
 By The Rivulet
 In A City Of Ships - Sounding
 In A City Of Ships - At Long Last

Lisa Nordström – voice, bass flute, zither, electronics
Lisen Rylander Löve – voice, tenor sax, bass clarinet, electronics
Michala Østergaard-Nielsen – drums, percussion

Recorded live sessions at 2nd Long Street Studios in Göteborg, 28 Feb & 1 Mars 2011 by Petter Ericsson. Assistant engineer Mikael Enqvist.
Mixed and mastered in Copenhagen by August Wanngren at We Know Music Studios.
The Zebra Crossing mixed in Göteborg by Petter Ericsson at Studio Epidemin.
All music by Midaircondo and Michala Østergaard-Nielsen.
Illustration by Åsa-Hanna Carlsson
Art work and cover design by Ola Ingvarsson
.

Midaircondo - Curtain Call
CD/LP, Twin Seed Recordings/Playground Scandinavia, 2009
 Curtain Call
 Come With Me
 Reports On The Horizon
 Below
 Bringing Me Home
 The Very Eye Of Night
 Silk, Silver And Stone
 Glowing Red
 Stay
 Revolve And Repeat
 Venetian Veil

Lisa Nordström – vocals, bass flute, flute, zither, kalimba, percussion, electronics Lisen Rylander Löve – vocals, tenor sax, bass clarinet, kalimba, piano, percussion, electronics

All music by Midaircondo
Verse lyrics/melody on Silk, Silver and Stone by Ebbot Lundberg
Ebbot Lundberg guest appearance courtesy of Akashic Records
Additional musicians Ebbot Lundberg – vocals (7) Chris Montgomery – drums (7,8) Livet Nord – violin (7) Emma Nordlund – cello (7) Johannes Lundberg – double bass (7) Petter Ericsson – double bass (3) Mika Takehara – drums and percussion (3,6) Thomas Markusson – double bass (9) 
(1,3,4,5,6,10,11) recorded at Rex Studio by Midaircondo,  (9) recorded at Studio Epidemin by Johannes Lundberg, (2,7,8) recorded at Rex Studio and Studio Epidemin by Midaircondo and Johannes Lundberg,   (1,2,5,6,7,8,9,10) mixed by Christoffer Berg at My Sonic Mountain, (3,11) mixed by Paul Bothén at Element Studio, (7) vocal mix by Johan Forsman
Produced by Midaircondo at Rex Studio Mastered by Andreas Tilliander at Repeatle 
Art direction and artwork – Ola Ingvarsson, Photo – Ida Borg,  Hair and make up – Ida Andersson, Styling – Ida Borg and Ida Andersson

Midaircondo - Shopping For Images
CD/2LP, Type Records, 2005
 Eva Stern, Shake It
 Could You Please Stop
 Serenade
 Coffeeshop
 Sorry
 Although I Heard
 Perfect Spot
 Who's Playing
 Lo-Fi Love
 She's So (LP only track)
 Faces
 I'll Be Waiting

Lisen Rylander – saxophone, vocals, kalimba, electronics
Lisa Nordström – flute, vocals, kalimba, melodica, various pieces of glass and metals, electronics
Malin Dahlström – vocals, finger cymbals, electronics

Per Störby – grand piano on Serenade, Thomas Markusson – double bass on Could You Please Stop, Andreas Tilliander – backing vocals on Perfect Spot, Piano loop on Serenade from Shostakovich used with kind permission.
Recorded at Repeatle (sthlm) and REX (gbg)
Mix by Midaircondo and Andreas Tilliander Mastered by Andreas Tilliander at Repeatle
Nicklas Hultman – artwork, Lisa Carlsson – cover and inside photo, Maria Nordström – costume and concept for portrait photo, Pontus Johansson – portrait photo of Midaircondo

Also appears on 

 Monsters – Karin Inde (CD/DL, Ingrid Sounds, 2011) Midaircondo appear on the tracks Intro Of Burn and Burn.
 The Göteborg String Theory (2LP/2CD/DL Kning Disk, 2010) Midaircondo appear with the track Come With Me.
 The Soundtrack Of Our Lives – Communion (2LP/2CD, Akashic Records, 2008) Midaircondo appear on the track Babel On.
 Ström – Pausfågeln Remixad (CD, Container Recordings, 2006) Midaircondo appear with the track Rosenfink / For Scarlet.
 Do You Copy? (2CD, Mitek, 2006) Midaircondo appear with the track Talkuin2it.

Collaborations and projects 

Midaircondo has previously worked with artist such as Michala Østergaard-Nielsen, Adrian Belew, Ebbot Lundberg, The Göteborg String Theory, Quartiett String Quartet, brass musicians from Malmö Symfoniorkester and AlterEgo New Music Ensemble. In 2006, Swedish national TV (SVT) made a documentary about the group and Swedish Radio frequently broadcasts the group's live performances. Midaircondo has also created music for dance performances, theater, TV, radio and film. They have also toured in support of José González and The Soundtrack of our Lives.

References

External links 

 Midaircondo
 Shakti (music)
 Playgroundmusic
 Discogs
 Soundcloud
 Youtube

Swedish musical duos
Musical groups established in 2007
Swedish electronic music groups
English-language singers from Sweden
Female musical duos
Electronic music duos